Płyćwia  is a village in the administrative district of Gmina Godzianów, within Skierniewice County, Łódź Voivodeship, in central Poland.

The village has a population of 511.

References

Villages in Skierniewice County